The 1959 Montana Grizzlies football team represented the University of Montana in the 1959 NCAA University Division football season as a member of the Skyline Conference (Skyline). The Grizzlies were led by second-year head coach Ray Jenkins, played their home games at Dornblaser Field and finished the season with a record of one win and eight losses (1–8, 1–5 Skyline).

Schedule

References

External links
1959 Grizzly Football Yearbook

Montana
Montana Grizzlies football seasons
Montana Grizzlies football